Walkers Limited was an Australian engineering company, based in Maryborough, Queensland. It built ships and railway locomotives.  The Walkers factory still produces railway locomotives and rolling stock as part of Downer Rail.

History

In 1863 John Walker and three friends set up the Union Foundry of John Walker & Co in Ballarat. In 1867 a branch was opened in Maryborough.

The Ballarat assets were disposed of in 1879 and in 1884, the business became a limited company under the title John Walker & Co Limited, being renamed Walkers Limited in 1888. The company produced most of the parts for machinery at sugar mills.

In 1980 Walkers Limited was sold to Evans Deakin Industries. It was included in the purchase of Evans Deakin by Downer Group in March 2001 and today the Maryborough factory continues to operate as part of Downer Rail.

In 2003 Bundaberg Foundry Engineers completed the acquisition of the Walkers Sugar Business and moved to change the operating name to Bundaberg Walkers Engineering in January 2008.

Ships
In 1884, the firm began work on five hopper barges for the Queensland Department of Harbours & Rivers. During construction the decision was taken to convert them to also serve as auxiliary gunboats, which made them the largest warships built in Australia before federation. Post war naval contracts included seven s in the late 1960s and eight  in the early 1970s. After the completion of the latter, Walker's Maryborough shipyard closed in 1974.

Royal Australian Navy ships
1 Bay-class frigate: 
2 River-class frigates:  and 
9 Koala-class boom defence vessel: HMAS Kimbla
2  Explorer class general-purpose vessels: HMAS Bass, HMAS Banks

Trains

The company's first locomotive was built at Maryborough in 1873 for William Pettigrew's (now heritage-listed) Cooloola Tramway; it was called "Mary Ann" as it was the name of the daughter of William Pettigrew and also the name of the daughter of his business partner William Sim. The first major contract for locomotives came in 1896, when an order for thirty B15 class steam locomotives was placed by Queensland Railways. In the 1960s Walkers offered a diesel-hydraulic unit to Queensland's sugar operators. Although not successful, it did sell six to BHP, Whyalla from 1962. It had more success with its DH class shunter with over 130 built for Queensland Rail, the New South Wales Government Railways, Emu Bay Railway and Western Australian Government Railways.

Steam locomotives
46 Queensland B class
122 Queensland PB15 class
45 Queensland C16 class
138 Queensland C17 class
6 Queensland C19 class
83 Queensland B18¼ class
25 Queensland BB18¼ class
20 Victorian DD class
20 Commonwealth Railways KA class
8 Commonwealth Railways C class
40 South Australian T class
3 Tasmanian Government Railways Q class

Diesel electric locomotives
12 Queensland 1170 class

Diesel hydraulic locomotives
6 BHP Whyalla DH class
3 Emu Bay Railway 10 class
73 Queensland Railways DH class
50 New South Wales 73 class
7 Emu Bay Railway 11 class
5 Western Australian Government Railways M class

Electric locomotives
50 Queensland Rail 3500/3600 class
30 Queensland Rail 3900 class

Electric multiple units

264 Queensland Rail EMU carriages
36 Queensland Rail SMU200 carriages
90 Queensland Rail SMU220 carriages
20 Queensland Rail ICE carriages
30 Queensland Rail IMU100 carriages
12 Queensland Rail IMU120 carriages
96 Transperth A series carriages
90 Kuala Lumpur Metro Line 3 & 4 light rail vehicles

Tilt Trains
12 Queensland Rail Tilt Train carriages

Awards 
In 2017, Walkers Limited was inducted into the Queensland Business Leaders Hall of Fame.  Walkers Limited is regarded as being one of Queensland's greatest companies spanning 150 years in the engineering manufacturing sector.

References

External links 

 Queensland Business Leaders Hall of Fame – 2017 Inductee digital story – Walkers Limited

Companies based in Queensland
Engineering companies of Australia
Defunct locomotive manufacturers of Australia
Maryborough, Queensland
Defunct rolling stock manufacturers of Australia
Shipbuilding companies of Australia
Shipyards of Australia
Australian companies established in 1863
Queensland in World War II